The Falcon's Malteser is a comic mystery by Anthony Horowitz. The first of The Diamond Brothers series, it was first published in 1986. The title is a spoof of The Maltese Falcon, to which there are various allusions throughout the story. The novel was adapted for the 1988 film Just Ask for Diamond.

Introduction to the Diamond brothers
Early on the book, Nick Simple (who narrates the story) explains that, before he went to live with his older brother Herbert, he had lived with his parents in a part of London called Wiernotta Mews (word play on Queen Victoria's famous phrase We're not amused). At the time, his parents planned to fly (with Nick) to Australia. Herbert had joined the police (one week before the local training station was destroyed in a fire, largely implied to be Herbert's fault), and could look after himself, more or less.

Nick, not wanting to go to Australia, managed to flee London Heathrow Airport at the last minute, leaving his parents to fly off to Sydney on their own, and going to live with Herbert. In the later stories he sometimes wishes he is still with his parents, mainly due to Herbert being such an awful and embarrassing guardian and the fact that their current financial situation is so bad. Herbert has been sacked, having shot the weapons training instructor in a freak accident and caused various other mishaps during his two months at Ladbroke Grove, and has set up a detective agency under the name "Tim Diamond".

Plot summary
Nicholas 'Nick' Simple and his older brother, Herbert Simple, meet Johnny Naples, a dwarf, who comes to the office carrying a suspicious package, and acting as if he is being trailed. He tries to explain the situation, whilst Herbert unsuccessfully tries to affect a hardman act.

Dumbfounded as to why Johnny Naples would pay them 200 pounds to look after a box of chocolates, they visit the (fictional) Hotel Splendide after a quick enquiry at a shop traced using a sign on the envelope, with the keeper saying that the owner of a hotel in Portobello Road mentioned to him that a dwarf was staying at his hotel.

A plain-clothes policeman, disguised as a drunk in the street, arrests them and they are sent to Ladbroke Grove Police Station, where Herbert's old boss, Chief Inspector Snape, accompanied by his violent assistant Boyle, arrives to question them. Snape who previously could not bear Herbert during his service there begins to form a grudging respect for Nick when he realises how smart he is for his age. When Nick offers to tell Snape everything the Diamonds know in exchange for what the police know, Snape begins to tell his story.

After finding a matchbox from a nightclub called The Casablanca Club (an acknowledgment to another one of Humphrey Bogart's movies), they decide to pay the club a visit. At home they find the Club is open, but their cleaning lady Betty Charlady says no good will come of it.

Quickly, they find that Naples must have been a regular there – a waiter mistakes Nick for him, and offers him a bottle of free champagne, and a singer called Lauren Bacardi (a take-off of film noir star and Bogart's wife Lauren Bacall) asks of Johnny's well-being. However, just moments after the brothers feel they are making progress, Bacardi is snatched by two shady figures in a blue van. Nick manages to step onto the back of the van, but soon is thrown off and into a wall of cardboard boxes. It is then revealed that Lauren has stolen the diamonds because she worked out the truth. As a parting gift she sends Nick and Herbert a Malteser with a diamond inside. Nick after realising this great wealth decides go skiing for their Christmas holidays. However Herbert breaks his leg before they get on the plane and the money is spent on medical bills.

Note
In this book, Nick calls his brother by his real name, Herbert, but in all following books he calls his brother Tim Diamond and calls himself Nick Diamond not Nicholas Simple or Herbert Simple for his brother.

Film adaptation
The film, Just Ask for Diamond, also known as Diamond's Edge, based on the novel, was released in 1988.

Stage adaptation
A stage adaptation, The Falcon's Malteser by Anthony Horowitz adapted for the stage by New Old Friends,  has been produced by New Old Friends theatre company (Feargus Dunlop & Heather Westwell) with input on the script from Horowitz himself. The first national tour of the show was in 2014 produced by New Old Friends in partnership with Walker Books, Theatre Royal Bath's Egg, Newbury Corn Exchange and the Natural Theatre Company. It was directed by Lee Lyford and features Tom Medcalf as Nick Diamond, Dan Winter as Inspector Snape & others, Feargus Dunlop as Tim Diamond, & Heather Westwell as Beatrice Von Falkenberg and others.

References

External links
 

The Diamond Brothers
1986 British novels
British children's novels
Novels by Anthony Horowitz
Children's mystery novels
British novels adapted into films
1986 children's books
Grafton (publisher) books